Manuel Pina "Manny" Babbitt (May 3, 1949 – May 4, 1999) was a U.S. Marine veteran of the Vietnam War who was convicted of the murder of a 78-year-old woman, Leah Schendel, during a burglary in Sacramento, California in 1980. He was executed by the state of California by lethal injection at San Quentin State Prison, one day after his 50th birthday. The murder was committed during a string of robberies and burglaries and the day after the murder Babbitt committed at least one sexual assault. Schendel died from a heart attack after Babbitt beat her and attempted to rape her.

Babbitt had been wounded at the bloody 1968 Battle of Khe Sanh in Quảng Trị Province, South Vietnam. As part of his defense, he claimed he suffered from Post-Traumatic Stress Disorder (PTSD) which he claimed caused him to commit his crimes and to later lose all memories of the crimes.

One year before his execution, while on death row, Babbitt was awarded a Purple Heart medal for the wounds he had received at the Battle of Khe Sanh.

Babbitt refused his last meal and asked that the $50 allotted be given to homeless Vietnam veterans. His last words were: "I forgive all of you." He was buried in his native Wareham, Massachusetts, on May 10, 1999, with full military honors.

The movie Last Day of Freedom, nominated for an Oscar in 2016, depicts his brother's narrative of the events that led to Babbitt's execution.

See also
 Capital punishment in California
 Capital punishment in the United States
 List of people executed in California

References

External links
 Bill Babbitt, California - Brother of Manny Babbitt, executed in California in 1999. Murder Victims' Families For Human Rights. Retrieved on 2007-11-16.
 Glantz, Aaron. Remembering Manny Babbitt. Truthdig (2007-07-17). Retrieved on 2007-11-16.
 King, Rachel. Pages 66-70. Capital Consequences: Families Of The Condemned Tell Their Stories. Rutgers University Press (2005). . Retrieved on 2007-11-16.
 Washington, Glynn. Snap Judgement 726 Brother's Keeper. Retrieved on 2017-12-16.

1949 births
1999 deaths
1980 murders in the United States
American people executed for murder
20th-century executions by California
United States Marine Corps personnel of the Vietnam War
People executed by California by lethal injection
Executed people from Massachusetts
People convicted of murder by California
People from Wareham, Massachusetts
20th-century executions of American people
United States Marines